The 1974 National Invitation Tournament was the 1974 edition of the annual NCAA college basketball competition.

Selected teams
Below is a list of the 16 teams selected for the tournament.

 Boston College
 Cincinnati
 Connecticut
 Fairfield
 Hawaii
 Jacksonville
 Manhattan
 Maryland Eastern Shore
 Massachusetts
 Memphis
 North Carolina
 Purdue
 Rutgers
 St. John's
 Seton Hall
 Utah

Bracket
Below is the tournament bracket.

See also
 1974 NCAA Division I Basketball Tournament
 1974 NCAA Division II Basketball Tournament
 1974 NAIA Division I men's basketball tournament
 1974 National Women's Invitational Tournament

References

National Invitation
National Invitation Tournament
1970s in Manhattan
Basketball in New York City
College sports in New York City
Madison Square Garden
National Invitation Tournament
National Invitation Tournament
Sports competitions in New York City
Sports in Manhattan